Lü Wei (born 18 January 1989 in Tianjin) is a Chinese footballer who plays as a defender.

Club career
Lü started his professional career with Chinese Super League side Tianjin Teda in 2009. He was sent to the reserved team in 2010. In February 2011, he moved to China League One side Shenyang Dongjin on a two-year loan deal. He returned to Tianjin in 2013 after Shenyang Dongjin relegated to China League Two. On 1 June 2013, he eventually made his Super League debut for Tianjin in a 1–0 away defeat against Dalian Aerbin.

On 4 January 2017, Lü moved to fellow Super League side Liaoning Whowin. He made his debut for Liaoning on 3 March 2017 in a 1–1 away draw against Guizhou Zhicheng, coming on as a substitute for Ni Yusong in the half time.

Career statistics 
Statistics accurate as of match played 31 December 2020.

References

External links
 

1989 births
Living people
Chinese footballers
Footballers from Tianjin
Tianjin Jinmen Tiger F.C. players
Shenyang Dongjin players
Liaoning F.C. players
Sichuan Jiuniu F.C. players
Chinese Super League players
China League One players
China League Two players
Association football defenders